Farnaz Esmaeilzadeh (born 29 َApril 1988) is an Iranian speed climber from Borujerd.
In 2015 she won a gold medal at the Canadian national championship and placed seventh in the IFSC Climbing World Cup overall rankings. Esmaeilzadeh received a silver medal in the 2016 climbing Escalade Canada (CEC) National Speed Climbing Championships in Central Saanich, British Columbia.

References

External links  
 https://www.ifsc-climbing.org/index.php/component/ifsc/?view=athlete&id=7380
 https://www.digitalrock.de/egroupware/ranking/sitemgr/digitalrock/pstambl.html#person=7380&cat=24

1988 births
Living people
Iranian rock climbers
People from Borujerd